Malparida (The Wicked Girl) is a 2010 Argentine telenovela aired by Channel 13 in the prime time. It ran from April 2010 to February 2011. It is protagonized antagonistically by Renata (played by Juana Viale), a cold and scheming woman seeking revenge against a man that had caused the death of her mother. The term "Malparida" (Misbegotten) denotes in Spanish a woman of questionable reputation.

Creation
Channel 13 had great success in 2009 with Valientes, a Primetime Soap Opera with a vengeance plot and a dramatic genre. After it ended, Alguien que me quiera, a comedy, took over the prime time but didn't achieve the same success.  Shortly after, it was re-scheduled and the prime time was given to a new dramatic soap opera called Malparida. Gonzalo Heredia, one of the main actors of Valientes, was chosen in one of the leading roles along with Juana Viale and Raúl Taibo.

The character Gracia, played by Selva Alemman, makes constant references to the pagan cult of San La Muerte.

The autistic character, Manu, played by Joaquín Wang took part in the script design because the scripts were still at a developing stage when he was hired.

Plot
Twenty years ago, Lorenzo Uribe discovered true love with Maria Herrera and began a romance. Lorenzo was rich, married, and had a young son: Lautaro. Maria was poor and unknown to Lorenzo, had a daughter called Renata. Maria's mother, Gracia, wanted her daughter to catch this rich man at all costs and convinced her that pregnancy would assure this. But before she could tell him, Uribe was pressured by his father to respect his obligations and regretfully ended the romance. He never knew that Maria gave birth to a child of his, an autistic son called Manu. Gracia drove her already depressed and heartbroken daughter Maria to commit suicide,  and ended up raising Renata, teaching her to hate Lorenzo and blame him for Maria's death. The story begins when Renata decides to take revenge on Lorenzo. Her mission was to seduce him, get him madly in love with her, leave him and watch him die of love. However, she didn't count on falling in love with Lautaro nor did she know of Lorenzo's dangerous brother, the Admiral.

Cast

Deaths

International broadcast

References

2010 telenovelas
2010 Argentine television series debuts
2011 Argentine television series endings
Argentine telenovelas
Spanish-language telenovelas
Pol-ka telenovelas
Television shows set in Buenos Aires
2010s Argentine drama television series